Ilyinka is a rural locality (a selo) in Bolshemogoysky Selsoviet of Volodarsky District, Astrakhan Oblast, Russia. The population was 35 as of 2010. There are 3 streets.

Geography 
Ilyinka is located 26 km southeast of Volodarsky (the district's administrative centre) by road. Meshkovo is the nearest rural locality.

References 

Rural localities in Volodarsky District, Astrakhan Oblast